Villisca is a city in Montgomery County, Iowa, United States. The population was 1,132 at the time of the 2020 census. It is most notable for the unsolved axe mass murder that took place in the town during the summer of 1912.

Geography
Villisca is located at  (40.929115, -94.978162).

Demographics

2010 census
As of the census of 2010, there were 1,252 people, 525 households, and 331 families living in the city. The racial makeup of the city was 97.4% White, 0.2% African American, 0.9% Native American, 0.2% Asian, 0.2% Pacific Islander, 0.6% from other races, and 0.5% from two or more races. Hispanic or Latino of any race were 3.0% of the population.

There were 525 households, of which 30.5% had children under the age of 18 living with them, 48.6% were married couples living together, 10.3% had a female householder with no husband present, 4.2% had a male householder with no wife present, and 37.0% were non-families. 31.6% of all households were made up of individuals, and 16.9% had someone living alone who was 65 years of age or older. The average household size was 2.32 and the average family size was 2.88.

The median age in the city was 42.6 years. 23.2% of residents were under the age of 18; 6.7% were between the ages of 18 and 24; 22.8% were from 25 to 44; 25.3% were from 45 to 64; and 22% were 65 years of age or older. The gender makeup of the city was 47.5% male and 52.5% female.

2000 census
As of the census of 2000, there were 1,344 people, 576 households, and 347 families living in the city. The racial makeup of the city was 98.81% White, 0.07% African American, 0.30% Native American, 0.07% Asian, 0.37% from other races, and 0.37% from two or more races. Hispanic or Latino of any race were 0.37% of the population.

There were 576 households, out of which 26.7% had children under the age of 18 living with them, 46.2% were married couples living together, 10.2% had a female householder with no husband present, and 39.6% were non-families. 34.9% of all households were made up of individuals, and 19.1% had someone living alone who was 65 years of age or older. The average household size was 2.23 and the average family size was 2.87.

In the city, the population was spread out, with 24.0% under the age of 18, 7.1% from 18 to 24, 22.8% from 25 to 44, 21.2% from 45 to 64, and 24.9% who were 65 years of age or older. The median age was 42 years. For every 100 females, there were 84.1 males. For every 100 females age 18 and over, there were 79.1 males.

The median income for a household in the city was $26,694, and the median income for a family was $34,345. Males had a median income of $28,500 versus $20,292 for females. The per capita income for the city was $14,067. About 9.3% of families and 12.9% of the population were below the poverty line, including 12.8% of those under age 18 and 9.2% of those age 65 or over.

Villisca axe murders

On the night of June 9, 1912, the Moore family and two guests were brutally murdered with an axe, though it was only on the morning of June 10, 1912, that they were found in their home by a neighbor and Ross Moore, the brother of Josiah Moore.

Josiah B. Moore and Sarah Montgomery were married on December 6, 1899. They had four children: Herman, Katherine, Boyd, and Paul. Joe was a prominent and well-liked businessman. By 1912, the Moore Implement Company (a John Deere Company franchise) was a solid competitor with other Villisca and area hardware stores, including the Jones Store owned by his former employer, F.F. Jones. Sarah was active in the Presbyterian church and assisted with Children's Day exercises. On the morning of June 10, 1912, Joe (43) and Sara (39), their four children, and two visiting children (Lena and Ina Stillinger), were found bludgeoned to death with the Moores' own axe. Their unsolved murders began a chain of events that split the borough of Villisca and forever changed the course of the town's history and the lives of its inhabitants.

The case has inspired several published books. Non-fiction accounts include Roy Marshall's Villisca (2003); Troy Taylor's Murdered in their Beds (2012); and The Man from the Train (2017) by Bill James and his daughter Rachel McCarthy James. Stephen Bowman's fictionalized Morning Ran Red was published in 2000. Kelly and Tammy Rundle's documentary Villisca: Living With a Mystery also dealt with the incident. The case has also inspired a feature narrative project titled Haunting Villisca, co-authored by James Serpento and Kimberly Busbee, directed by Serpento and produced by Busbee for AriesWorks Entertainment. Haunting Villisca combines a fictionalized present-day scenario with scenes suggested by courtroom transcripts, folklore and current paranormal investigations of the house where the murders occurred. The picture premiered in Villisca in the spring of 2008. The crime is also the inspiration for the song "Villisca" by the band Strange Family.

Education
It is within the Villisca Community School District. Residents are zoned to Southwest Valley High School, operated by the Corning Community School District, and shared with the Villisca district as part of a grade-sharing agreement.

Notable people
Frank Fernando Jones, Iowa state legislator and axe murder suspect, lived in Villisca.
Randy Weaver, Ruby Ridge Standoff incident, born in Villisca.
Jeremy Greenfield, United States Marine Corps fighter pilot then major airline pilot.
Eric Kline, United States Air Force Special Agent (Ret) and Founder of Trophy Bucks of Iowa.
Luke 'Big Puss' Anderson, Radio personality and chief executive producer with The Todd and Tyler Radio Empire.

References

External links

 
vilisca.com - Official website of the city, which tells the story in its entirety.
Villisca Historical Society website
Villisca Review
Villisca: Living With a Mystery movie website
Haunting Villisca fictional movie website
The Olson Linn Museum aka The Villisca Axe Murder House

Cities in Montgomery County, Iowa
Cities in Iowa